Thomas W. Reps (born 28 May 1956, United States) is an American computer scientist known for his contributions to automatic program analysis. Dr. Reps is Professor of Computer Science in the Computer Sciences Department of the University of Wisconsin–Madison, which he joined in 1985. Reps is the author or co-author of four books and more than one hundred seventy-five papers describing his research. His work has covered a wide variety of topics, including program slicing, data-flow analysis, pointer analysis, model checking, computer security, instrumentation (computer programming), language-based program-development environments, the use of program profiling in software testing, software renovation, incremental algorithms, and attribute grammars.

Reps’s current work focuses on static analysis of stripped (binary) executables, and methods that—without relying on symbol-table or debugging information—recover intermediate representations that are similar to those the intermediate phases of a compiler creates for a program written in a high-level language. The goal is to provide a disassembler or decompiler platform that an analyst can use to understand the workings of COTS components, plugins, mobile code, and DLLs, as well as memory snapshots of worms and virus-infected code.

Reps was President and Co-founder of GrammaTech, Inc.

Awards and honors
Reps has been the recipient of the following awards:

ACM Doctoral Dissertation Award (1983)
National Science Foundation Presidential Young Investigator Award (1986)
Packard Fellowship (1988)
Humboldt Research Award (2000)
Guggenheim Fellowship (2000)
Horwitz, S., Reps T., and Binkley, D., "Interprocedural slicing using dependence graphs" selected as one of the 50 most influential papers from ACM PLDI, 1979-99 (2002)
Institute for Scientific Information "Highly Cited Researcher"(2003)
European Association for Programming Languages and Systems Best-Paper Award at ETAPS (with G. Balakrishnan) (2004)
ACM Fellow (2005)
European Association for Programming Languages and Systems Best-Paper Award at ETAPS (with J. Lim) (2008)
ACM SIGSOFT Retrospective Impact Paper Award (with T. Teitelbaum) (2010)
ACM SIGSOFT Retrospective Impact Paper Award (with S. Horwitz, M. Sagiv, and G. Rosay) (2011)
Foreign member of Academia Europaea (2013)
Ranked 8th (citations) and 4th (field rating) on Microsoft Academic Search's list of most-highly cited authors in the field of Programming Languages (2013), and 23rd (citations) and 13th (field rating) on its list of most-highly cited authors in the field of Software Engineering (2013)
ACM SIGPLAN Programming Languages Achievement Award (2017)

References

External links 
Website

1956 births
Living people
Harvard University alumni
Cornell University alumni
American computer scientists
Programming language researchers
Academic journal editors
Computer science writers
American textbook writers
American male non-fiction writers
Fellows of the Association for Computing Machinery
University of Wisconsin–Madison faculty